Andriy Valeriyovych Bliznichenko (born 24 July 1994) is a Ukrainian professional footballer who plays as a midfielder for Veres Rivne.

Career
Bliznichenko joined FC Dnipro starting in the 2012–13 season, playing 14 games for the reserve team and scoring 6 goals. He debuted for the senior team on 28 November 2013 in a Europa League group stage match against CS Pandurii Târgu Jiu, coming on for Bruno Gama and playing the entire second half. On 9 January 2023 he moved to Veres Rivne.

Honours
Sheriff Tiraspol 
 Moldovan National Division: 2020–21

Dnipro
 Ukrainian Premier League: Runner-Up 2013–14
 UEFA Europa League: Runner-Up 2014–15

Personal life
Andriy Bliznichenko is the older brother of fellow footballer, Viktor Bliznichenko.

References

External links
 
 

1994 births
Living people
People from Zviahel
Association football forwards
Ukrainian footballers
Ukraine youth international footballers
Ukraine under-21 international footballers
FC Dnipro players
Kardemir Karabükspor footballers
FC Sheriff Tiraspol players
FC Inhulets Petrove players
Ukrainian Premier League players
Süper Lig players
TFF First League players
Moldovan Super Liga players
Ukrainian expatriate footballers
Expatriate footballers in Turkey
Ukrainian expatriate sportspeople in Turkey
Expatriate footballers in Moldova
Ukrainian expatriate sportspeople in Moldova
Sportspeople from Zhytomyr Oblast